The 1973–74 South-West Indian Ocean cyclone season was a below-average cyclone season. The season officially ran from November 1, 1973, to April 30, 1974.


Systems

Moderate Tropical Storm Alice

Alice was born around 80E, and reached its greatest intensity (Phase C plus) on September 20 to the north of Tromelin. but has resulted in some light to moderate rain over extreme northeastern Madagascar between 21 and 23, the winds not exceeding 55 km / h in the region of Diego-Suarez.

Tropical Cyclone Bernadette

Bernadette, more active than before, has reached the stage of a tropical cyclone in the strict sense of the international classification, in the 26th October (minimum pressure estimated of 985 mb), moderate rainfall strong enough of have been recorded on the extreme north of Madagascar and off the cape of Amber, a boat noted a peak wind of 139 km/h.

Moderate Tropical Storm Christiane

Moderate Tropical Storm Christian existed from December 13 to December 21.

Intense Tropical Cyclone Deidre–Delinda

Tropical Cyclone Deidre-Delinda existed from December 26, 1973, to January 4, 1974.

Moderate Tropical Storm Esmeralda

Moderate Tropical Storm Esmeralda existed from December 30, 1973, to January 5, 1974. The storm looped to the southeast of Madagascar, bringing several days of rainfall to Réunion, reaching .

Tropical Disturbance Fredegonde

Tropical Disturbance Fredegonde existed from January 19 to January 23.

Tropical Cyclone Ghislaine

Moderate Tropical Storm Ghislaine existed from February 24 to March 3.

Severe Tropical Storm Honorine

Moderate Tropical Storm Honorine existed from April 12 to April 23.

Season effects

|-
| Alice ||  || bgcolor=#| || bgcolor=#| || bgcolor=#| || Madagascar ||  ||  ||
|-
| Bernadette ||  || bgcolor=#| || bgcolor=#| || bgcolor=#| || None ||  ||  ||
|-
| Christiane ||  || bgcolor=#| || bgcolor=#| || bgcolor=#| || None ||  ||  ||
|-
| Deidre–Delinda ||  || bgcolor=#| || bgcolor=#| || bgcolor=#| || None ||  ||  ||
|-
| Esmeralda ||  || bgcolor=#| || bgcolor=#| || gcolor=#| || None ||  ||  ||
|-
| Fredegonde ||  || bgcolor=#| || bgcolor=#| || bgcolor=#| || None ||  ||  ||
|-
| Ghislaine ||  || bgcolor=#| || bgcolor=#| || bgcolor=#| || None ||  ||  ||
|-
| Honorine ||  || b bgcolor=#| || bgcolor=#| || bgcolor=#| || None ||  ||  ||
|-

See also

 Atlantic hurricane seasons: 1973, 1974
 Eastern Pacific hurricane seasons: 1973, 1974
 Western Pacific typhoon seasons: 1973, 1974
 North Indian Ocean cyclone seasons: 1973, 1974

References

South-West_Indian_Ocean cyclone seasons
1973–74 Southern Hemisphere tropical cyclone season